Ratko Vansimpsen (born 16 July 1989) is a Belgian professional footballer who plays for Dessel Sport, as a striker.

Early and personal life
Vansimpsen was born in Sint-Truiden, Belgium. He was named after Serbian goalkeeper Ratko Svilar. He is half-Dutch, and from the age of 16 lived in Tilburg in the Netherlands. His wife is Dutch and he speaks with a Dutch accent. When not playing football, Vansimpsen cares for his young daughter.

Career
Vansimpsen played youth football with Sint-Truiden and Willem II.

Vansimpsen has played professionally with FC Eindhoven, Dessel Sport, Eendracht Aalst and Beerschot Wilrijk.

He was top scorer (with 10 goals) during his first season with FC Eindhoven, but his second season was interrupted by injury. He was also the top scorer (again with 10 goals) during his first season with Dessel Sport, although his second season was also marred by injury problems.

He moved from Dessel Sport to Eendracht Aalst in May 2014, after rejecting a new contract offer from his former club.

He returned to Dessel Sport in May 2016.

References

1989 births
People from Sint-Truiden
Living people
Belgian footballers
Sint-Truidense V.V. players
Willem II (football club) players
FC Eindhoven players
K.F.C. Dessel Sport players
S.C. Eendracht Aalst players
K Beerschot VA players
Eerste Divisie players
Challenger Pro League players
Association football forwards
Belgian expatriate footballers
Belgian expatriate sportspeople in the Netherlands
Expatriate footballers in the Netherlands
Footballers from Limburg (Belgium)